Sosa Joseph (born 1971) is an Indian contemporary artist living in Kochi, Kerala. She is considered an important exponent of the contemporary female art in Kerala, India. Joseph studied at the Raja Ravi Varma College of Fine Arts, Mavelikara Kerala, and the Maharaja Sayajirao University of Baroda. In 2015 her work was exhibited at the Stedelijk Museum Amsterdam. In 2016 she exhibited at the Setouchi Triennale in Shodoshima, Japan, and in 2018 she was included in the 21st Biennale of Sydney.

References

External links
 images of Joseph's art at MutuaArt
 images of Joseph's art at Galerie Mirchandani + Steinruecke

1971 births
Indian women contemporary artists
Indian contemporary painters
Living people
Maharaja Sayajirao University of Baroda alumni
Kochi-Muziris Biennale
Raja Ravi Varma College of Fine Arts alumni
Painters from Kerala
People from Pathanamthitta district
Indian women painters
Women artists from Kerala
20th-century Indian women artists
21st-century Indian women artists
20th-century Indian painters
21st-century Indian painters